Marek Maciejewski (born 6 June 1977 in Toruń) is a Polish former professional cyclist.

Major results
2001
1st Stage 6 Tour du Maroc
2005
1st Neuseen Classics – Rund um die Braunkohle
1st Memoriał Henryka Łasaka
2006
1st Stages 1 & 5 Tour du Sénégal

References

1977 births
Living people
Polish male cyclists
Sportspeople from Toruń